Yahya bin Mahfoudh al-Mantheri is a politician from Oman who served as Chairmen of the Council of State of Oman. He has been also served as Minister of Higher Education of Oman and Chairmen of Sultan Qaboos University.

References 

Education ministers of Oman
Academic staff of Sultan Qaboos University